79th parallel may refer to:

79th parallel north, a circle of latitude in the Northern Hemisphere
79th parallel south, a circle of latitude in the Southern Hemisphere